Monsignor Dr. Joakim Herbut (Macedonian/Serbian: Јоаким Хербут) 14 February 1928 – 15 April 2005) was a Macedonian Catholic prelate. He was bishop of the Roman Catholic diocese of Skopje-Prizren from 1969 to 2005 and exarch of the Greek Catholic Apostolic Exarch of Macedonia from 2001 to 2005.

Born in village of Ruski Krstur in present-day Serbia, autonomous province of Vojvodina on 14 February 1928 in Rusyn family. He was ordained a priest on 6 July 1952 by Bishop Gabrijel Bukatko for the Eparchy of Križevci. Fr. Herbut was the personal assistant in Skopje from 1954 to 1957 and in Križevci from 1957 to 1959. and as bishop of Skopje-Prizren diocese was placed on October 2, 1969 by Pope Paul VI and the inauguration took place on December 21, 1969. Also from 3 July 1972 he served as apostolic visitator for the Byzantine Rite faithful in Yugoslav Macedonia and later he was appointed the head of the renewed Apostolic Exarch of Macedonia on January 11, 2001.

Monsignor Joakim Herbut died in Skopje on April 15, 2005.

References

1928 births
2005 deaths
People from Kula, Serbia
Serbian people of Rusyn descent
Pannonian Rusyns
Macedonian Eastern Catholics
20th-century Eastern Catholic bishops
21st-century Eastern Catholic bishops
Macedonian Greek Catholic Church
20th-century Roman Catholic bishops in North Macedonia
Roman Catholic bishops in Yugoslavia
Bishops of Skopje
Macedonian Roman Catholic bishops